Dublin 8, also rendered as D8 and D08, is a historic postal district in Dublin. D8 is one of only two postal districts to span the River Liffey. While the majority of the code's built up areas are on the southside, it also includes northside areas such as the vast Phoenix Park. A 2018 article in The Irish Times noted that, while the area was historically known for the manufacture of silk and wool, Dublin 8's "streets, alleys and quaysides are [now] replete with hipster cafes, cocktail bars and family-friendly restaurants".

Area profile 
Dublin 8 was named one of the "coolest neighbourhoods" in the world by Time Out in 2021. Forecasting by Knight Frank, which put the area on a so-called global hot list, has indicated the district could face property price growth of up to 20% in the coming years. However, further research has shown that rapid, large-scale transformation and gentrification in the postal code has left some of its residents feeling powerless and voiceless.

On Heytesbury Street, the area is home to the largest collection of intact one floor over basement houses in the city. This is a style of home unique to Ireland. The Victorian structures were built for the lower middle classes from the 1830s onwards, as the city's population increased despite the Great Famine.

Notable places 
Dublin 8 includes Dolphin's Barn, Inchicore, Islandbridge, Kilmainham, Merchants Quay, Portobello, South Circular Road, the Phoenix Park and the Liberties. Notable buildings include Christ Church Cathedral and St. Patrick's Cathedral.

Usage in Dublin addresses 
Colloquially, Dubliners simply refer to the area as "Dublin 8". The postal district forms the first part of numerous seven digit Eircodes that are unique to every single address in the area. For addressing purposes, it appears in both its original form as Dublin 8 and as the first part of a seven digit postal code as D08 a line below. For example:
 Liberties College  
 Bull Alley Street
 Dublin 8
 D08 A8N0

Gallery

See also 

 List of Dublin postal districts
 List of Eircode routing areas in Ireland
 List of postal codes

References 

Postal districts of Dublin